Pit Fighter is a 2005 action film directed by Jesse V. Johnson and starring Dominique Vandenberg, Steven Bauer and Stephen Graham and Scott Adkins.

Plot
Jack Severino (Dominique Vandenberg) is a quiet yet intense man who has no recollection of his past. He spends his time in violent Vale Tudo fights in a small South American village. The only friend he has is his manager Manolo (Steven Bauer), an Indian trying to escape poverty. Jack's violent past catches up with him when he sees a woman (Stana Katic) he has not seen in years bring back his memories.

Cast
 Dominique Vandenberg as Jack Severino
 Steven Bauer as Manolo
 Fernando Carrillo as Veneno
 Stephen Graham as Harry
 Stana Katic as Marianne
 Scott Adkins as Nathan
 Timothy V. Murphy as Father Michael
 Ric Sarabia as Dr. Vincent
 Carlos Buti as Carlos
 Catherine Munden as Virgin Mary
 Fivel Stewart as Lucinda
 Eddie Morales as Don Rafael
 Erich A. Muller as Julio Zambista
 Andre McCoy as Brazilian Fighter
 Marco Khan as Russian Fighter
 Gary Gray as Supremacist Fighter
 Edwin Villa as Capoeira Fighter
 Ciona Johnson as Female Fighter
 Kim Collea as Female Fighter
 Maurice Negro as Wrestler
 Paul Cullen as 'Scarface'
 Alice Amter as Palm Reader
 Celina Zambon as Dancer
 Aspen Stevens as Dancer
 Fernanda Romero as Conchita (uncredited)
 Al Burke as Mob Boss (uncredited)
 Booboo Stewart as Vendor (uncredited)
 Maegan Stewart as Vendor (uncredited)

Reception
The film was not well received by critics and has a 0% fresh rating (from 3 reviews) on Rotten Tomatoes and David Nusair of Reel Film said "There've been a lot of bad straight-to-video action flicks over the years, but this is surely the worst". DVD Talk reviewer Scott Weinberg said in his review, "Just because something's (very) cheaply made, amazingly generic, and more than a little stupid -- that doesn't mean it's boring. And if you're the sort of movie fan who'd grab a DVD called Pit Fighter from the shelf and flip it over to read the plot synopsis -- then Pit Fighter is probably something you'd enjoy."

References

External links

2005 films
2005 action thriller films
American martial arts films
American action thriller films
Mixed martial arts films
Martial arts tournament films
2000s English-language films
Films directed by Jesse V. Johnson
2000s American films